Toulouse Street is the second studio album by American rock band the Doobie Brothers. It was released on July 1, 1972, by Warner Bros. Records. It was the band's first album with bassist Tiran Porter and second with drummer Michael Hossack to augment existing drummer John Hartman, putting in place their trademark twin-drummer sound. Toulouse Street is the name of a street in the French Quarter of New Orleans. The cover and inside centerfold photos were taken at a former brothel on Toulouse Street.

The album peaked at number 21 on the Billboard 200.

Track listing

Personnel
The Doobie Brothers
Tom Johnston – lead and backing vocals, acoustic and electric guitars
Patrick Simmons – lead and backing vocals, acoustic and electric guitars, banjo on "Listen to the Music"
Tiran Porter – backing vocals, bass except “Toulouse Street”
Dave Shogren – bass and acoustic guitar on "Toulouse Street", backing vocals on "White Sun"
John (Little John) Hartman – drums, percussion
Michael Hossack – drums, steel drums on "Listen to the Music"

Additional personnel
Bill Payne – piano on "Rockin' Down the Highway" and "Don't Start Me to Talkin'", organ on "Cotton Mouth" and "Jesus Is Just Alright"
Jerry Jumonville – tenor saxophone on "Cotton Mouth" and "Don't Start Me to Talkin'"
Jon Robert Smith – tenor saxophone on "Cotton Mouth" and "Don't Start Me to Talkin'"
Joe Lane Davis – baritone saxophone on "Cotton Mouth" and "Don't Start Me to Talkin'"
Sherman Marshall Cyr – trumpet on "Cotton Mouth" and "Don't Start Me to Talkin'"
Ted Templeman – additional percussion
uncredited – flute on "Toulouse Street"

Production
Producer: Ted Templeman
Associate Producers on Tracks 4, 8 & 10: Stephen Barncard and Marty Cohn
Engineer: Stephen Barncard, Marty Cohn, Donn Landee
Production Coordination: Benita Brazier
Design: Barbara Casado, John Casado
Remastering: Lee Herschberg
Photography: Jill  Maggid, Michael Maggid
Art Direction: Ed Thrasher
Horn Arrangements on Tracks 5 & 6: Jerry Jumonville

Charts

Certifications

References

 

1972 albums
The Doobie Brothers albums
Albums produced by Ted Templeman
Warner Records albums
Albums recorded at Wally Heider Studios
Albums produced by Stephen Barncard